Thynne is a surname. Notable people with the surname include:
Lord Alexander Thynne DSO (1873–1918), British soldier and Conservative politician
Andrew Joseph Thynne (1847–1927), Australian politician
 Lord Edward Thynne (1807–1884), British soldier and Conservative politician
Francis Thynne (1544–1608), officer of arms at the College of Arms in London
George Thynne, 2nd Baron Carteret PC (1770–1838), British Tory politician
Henry Thynne, 3rd Marquess of Bath (1797–1837), British naval commander and politician
Henry Thynne, 6th Marquess of Bath JP (1905–1992), British politician, aristocrat and landowner
Lord Henry Thynne PC, DL (1832–1904), British Conservative politician
Hercules Grytpype-Thynne, character from the British 1950s comedy radio programme The Goon Show
James Thynne (1605–1670), English landowner and politician who sat in the House of Commons in two periods between 1640 and 1670
Joan Thynne
John Thynne (1515–1580), the steward to Edward Seymour, 1st Duke of Somerset (c. 1506 – 1552) and a member of parliament
John Thynne (died 1604)
John Thynne, 3rd Baron Carteret PC (1772–1849), British peer and politician
John Thynne, 4th Marquess of Bath (1831–1896), British diplomat and a peer for almost sixty years
Lady Louisa Thynne (1760–1832), British naturalist and botanical illustrator, later Louisa Finch, Countess of Aylesford
Thomas Thynne, 1st Marquess of Bath KG (1734–1796), British politician who held office under George III
Thomas Thynne, 1st Viscount Weymouth (1640–1714), British peer in the peerage of England
Thomas Thynne, 2nd Marquess of Bath KG (1765–1837), British peer
Thomas Thynne, 2nd Viscount Weymouth (1710–1751), English peer, descended from the first Sir John Thynne of Longleat House
Thomas Thynne, 5th Marquess of Bath KG, CB, PC, JP (1862–1946), British landowner and Conservative politician
Thomas Thynne (died 1639) (1578–1639), of Longleat, Wiltshire, was an English landowner and member of parliament
Thomas Thynne (died 1669) (1610–1669), English politician who sat in the House of Commons in 1660
Thomas Thynne (died 1682) (1647–1682), English landowner and politician who sat in the House of Commons from 1670 to 1682
Ulric Oliver Thynne (1871–1957), British champion polo player
Ayden Robert Paul Thynne (2002-Present),
Canadian Soldier Pte (b)from 2021 to Present